Phuktal Monastery or Phuktal Gompa (often transliterated as Phugtal) is a Buddhist monastery located in the remote Lungnak Valley in south-eastern Zanskar, in the Himalayan region of Ladakh, in Northern India. It is one of the only Buddhist monasteries in Ladakh that can still be reached only by foot. Supplies to the monastery are brought on horses, donkeys, and mules in the warmer months, and in the frozen winters, they are transported through the frozen Zanskar River. A road is expected to be built up to the monastery, however, for now, it is a day's walk from Village Cha or Village Khangsaar, the end of the road leading from Padum. Solar power was installed at the Phugtal monastery in 2016 with a team of Global Himalayan Expedition (GHE) members.

Etymology
The Phuktal Gompa owes its legacy to powerful and renowned scholars and teachers who resided in the cave, around which the monastery has been built, and has for long been a place for retreat, meditation, learning, and teaching. This is reflected in its name Phuktal, which is derived from Phukthal, made up of Phuk ཕུག meaning 'cave', and Tal དལ་ or Thal meaning 'at leisure' in the endangered Zangskari dialect of the Tibetic languages. An alternate spelling of Phuktal is Phukthar, where Thar ཐར means 'liberation'. Hence, the name Phuktal means 'the cave of leisure' or 'the cave of liberation'.

History
The Phuktal Monastery is built around a natural cave, which is believed to have been visited by numerous sages, scholars, translators, and monks around 2,550 years ago. The remote location of the monastery was ideal for monks looking for peace and solitude to meditate. The present Phuktal Gompa, of the Gelug school of Tibetan Buddhism, was established in the early 15th century by Jangsem Sherap Zangpo, a disciple of Je Tsongkhapa. Tsongkhapa was the founder of Gelug, which is one of the newest schools of Tibetan Buddhism.

Believed to be one of the earliest residents of the cave are the 16 Arhats, or the legendary followers of Buddha. The images of these 16 Arhats appear on the cave walls. The great scholars and translators Padmasambhava and Phakspa Nestan Dusdan are believed to have lived in the cave, and so is the great leader and translator Lama Marpa Lotsawa. In the 12th century, the Tibetan translator Zanskar Lotsawa Phagpa Sherab also lived and worked from Phuktal. The eminent scholars and brothers Dangsong, Pun, and Sum, who were believed to have the supernatural power of flight gave teachings on Dharma at Phuktal. When Jangsem Sherap Zangpo arrived at Phuktal, the three brothers bequeathed the holy site to him and departed. According to legend, the spiritually gifted Zangpo caused a spring to appear and run from the cave, a tree to grow on top of the cave and for the cave itself to grow larger in size. Then, under his guidance, the present structure of the monastery was built around the cave. It is built in the cliffside, like a honeycomb. The cliff is part of a lateral gorge of a major tributary of the Lungnak River (Lingti-Tsarap River). The monastery today houses a main temple, prayer rooms, a library with rare sacred texts, apartments and living quarters, teaching facilities, a kitchen, and of course, the original cave and the sacred spring, which is protected. It is home to about 70 monks.

There is a stone tablet which serves as a reminder of the stay of Alexander Csoma de Kőrös at Phuktal, while he worked on the first English-Tibetan dictionary between 1826 and 1827, when he explored Ladakh.

Clinic and Village life
The Phuktal Gompa maintains a Traditional Tibetan medical clinic, catering to the local community. There is an on-site Amchi, a traditional Tibetan physician who provides natural Sowa-Rigpa medicine, many of which have been prepared at the monastery itself. The village life in the Lungnak Valley revolves around the monastery. Monks from the monastery attend local village events of significance, such as birth, deaths and weddings, performing traditional prayer ceremonies. The villagers visit the monastery to offer prayers, consult the Amchi and to attend festivals and special events at the monastery.

The village and the monastery has remained ignored for any modern development. The Monastery was electrified by Global Himalayan Expedition in July 2016 through setting up of solar micro-grids.

Festivals
Festivals are an important part of the Phuktal Gompa. There are an occasion for the monks to interact with the villagers and for the villagers to visit the monastery. They help to preserve the centuries-old traditions and to spread dharma. They also enable the monks to accumulate good karma for the next life through offerings, worship, prayers and service. The festivals celebrated at Phuktal Monastery, starting around the end of February, are as mentioned. The Tibetan calendar is a lunisolar calendar, hence the dates for these festivals differ each year as compared to the Gregorian calendar.
 Smonlam Chenmo: The Smonlam Chenmo, also known as Monlam Chenmo (Tibetan for 'great prayer') is the most important Tibetan Buddhist celebration of the year, and signifies the start of the New Year. Special ceremonies are held for world peace and the wellbeing of all people. It falls towards the end of February or the beginning of March.
Chudsum Chodpa: This festival is held right after the Smonlam Chenmo. It is held to worship thirteen special deities.
Chonga Chodpa: This is celebrated immediately after the Chudsum Chodpa and is a harvest ceremony. For this festival, monks create a special torma, which is a statue made of barley flour and butter, and is worshipped by villagers.
Gyalwe Jabstan: Held after the Chonga Chodpa, this festival involves a puja for the long life of the 14th Dalai Lama.
Jigched Lhachusum Ceremony: This ceremony is held between the end of March and the end of May or the beginning of June.
Initiation of Vajrabhairava: This festival is for the worship of Vajrabhairava, the most wrathful form of Manjushri. It is celebrated towards the end of May or the beginning of June.
Syungnas: The festival of Syungnas is a fasting ceremony to purge oneself of all sin and to accumulate good karma. It is celebrated after mid-June.
Yarnas: This is also known as the Varshavas Ceremony. For this ceremony, monks remain confined within the monastery and some limited outlying areas and perform special daily pujas to avoid and make good the negative karma accumulated from treading upon plants, insects and microorganisms. It is held between the end of July to mid September, and visitors need to obtain special permission from the head Lama of the monastery to attend a short portion of the Yarnas.
Gadam Nagchod: The Gadam Nagchod or the Lightning Ceremony is held sometime during the beginning of December to mark the death anniversary of Je Tsongkhapa, the founder of the Gelug branch of Tibetan Buddhism.
Phukta Gutor: Held towards the end of February, and before the Smonlam Chenmo, this festival is one of the most important festivals at Phuktal Gompa. It signals the end of the Tibetan year, and is held for world peace and harmony. It is attended by many Zanskaris and Ladakhis.

Phuktal Monastic School

Phuktal Gompa has set up the Phuktal Monastic School that caters to the students of the local Lungnak Valley of the Zanskar. The school was set up in 1993, at the behest of Geshe Lharampa Nagri Choszed. Complete education is provided, which involves a mix of traditional learning and modern curriculum. No fees are charged from the students, and the monastery bears the cost for the room, board and study materials of the students, with help from sponsors. A lot of the students are children from the local farming families in the Lungnak Valley, which are extremely poor and least educated. A school like Phuktal Monastic School offers them quality education without any charge or fees.

Phuktal River Blockade and Floods
On 31 December 2014, a landslide occurred between the Shun and Phuktal villages. This caused the formation of a landslide dam on the Phuktal River. It was first noticed due to the recession in the water level of the Nimoo Bazgo Hydroelectric Plant down the river. The lake formed behind the dam increased in length and height as compared to the height of the blockade. In May 2015, the Phuktal River flooded and washed away the entire school campus. The building, equipment, materials, and stores were all destroyed. The monastery has applied to the Jammu and Kashmir State Government and the Central Government for grants and financial aid to help rebuild the school and monastery and undo the damage of the flood.

Gallery

References

External links

Phuktal Gompa
Ladakh-Kashmir
Jangsem Sherab Zangpo
Photos taken in the kitchen of Phugtal Monastery
Portraits of monks at Phugtal Monastery
National Remote Sensing Centre: Phuktal Blockade

Buddhist monasteries in Ladakh
Ladakh